The Philippine creepers or rhabdornises are small passerine birds and form the genus Rhabdornis. They are endemic to the Philippines. They do not migrate, other than to make local movements.

Taxonomy
The genus Rhabdornis was introduced in 1853 by German naturalist Ludwig Reichenbach to accommodate the stripe-headed rhabdornis. The name combines the Ancient Greek rhabdos meaning "stripe" with ornis meaning "bird."

The relationship of the Philippine creepers to other bird species was formerly uncertain and the genus Rhabdornis was placed in its own family Rhabdornithinae. Molecular phylogenetic studies have revealed that the Philippine creepers are aberrant members of the starling family Sturnidae.

The genus contains four species:
 Stripe-headed rhabdornis, stripe-headed rhabdornis or stripe-sided rhabdornis, Rhabdornis mystacalis
 Grand rhabdornis, long-billed rhabdornis or grand rhabdornis, Rhabdornis grandis
 Stripe-breasted rhabdornis, plain-headed creeper or stripe-breasted rhabdornis, Rhabdornis inornatus
Visayan rhabdornis, Rhabdornis rabori

Description
The Philippine creepers are similar in appearance to treecreepers (Certhiidae). They have thin pointed down-curved bills, which they can use to extricate insects from bark, but they have brush-like tongues, which enable them to also feed on nectar.

References

External links

 Don Robertson's Bird Families of the World: Rhabornises. Contains photos of all 3 species. Version of 2006-JAN-25. Retrieved 2007-JUL-20.
 Flickr Field Guide: Birds of the World: Photo of Rhabdornis mystacalis. Retrieved 2007-JUL-19.

Sturnidae
 

Taxa named by Ludwig Reichenbach

hu:Barkósfakuszfélék